The Diocese of Scranton is a Latin Church ecclesiastical jurisdiction or diocese of the Catholic Church. It is a suffragan see of Archdiocese of Philadelphia, established on March 3, 1868.   The seat of the bishop is St. Peter's Cathedral in the most populated city in the diocese, Scranton, Pennsylvania. Other cities in the diocese include Wilkes-Barre, Williamsport, Hazleton, Nanticoke,  Carbondale, and Pittston.

The diocese comprises Lackawanna, Luzerne, Bradford, Susquehanna, Wayne, Tioga, Sullivan, Wyoming, Lycoming, Pike, and Monroe counties, all in the northeastern part of Pennsylvania.

Early history

The first Catholic settlers in the area were principally of Irish and German descent. In the late 19th and early 20th centuries, Slavic and Italian populations attracted by the coal-mining industry came to comprise one-half of the Catholic population.

Although many of the early settlers were Catholic immigrants, the first official visit of a priest to this territory of which there is any authentic record was not until 1787. In that year (during the suppression of the Society of Jesus) the former Jesuit James Pellentz (1727–1800) traveled from Baltimore up the Susquehanna River as far as Elmira, New York, ministering to the Catholics scattered through this region. A few years later, the famous French settlement of Asylum or "Azilum" was founded (1793–94). Planned as a retreat for French nobility, the site chosen was on the banks of the Susquehanna River, opposite the present village of Standing Stone in Bradford County. Today scarcely a trace of this unique settlement remains.

The earliest permanent Catholic settlements were at Friendsville and Silver Lake in Susquehanna County. These, as well as the other Catholic settlers scattered throughout this district, were attended occasionally by priests sent from Philadelphia. In 1825 – largely due to the solicitations of Patrick Griffin, father of Gerald Griffin – Francis Kenrick, Bishop of Philadelphia, sent the Rev. John O'Flynn as the first resident pastor. His work, however, was similar to that of a missionary, as his field of labor comprised thirteen counties in northeastern Pennsylvania and five counties in New York state.

The first church in the diocese was built in 1825 near Silver Lake. Father O'Flynn died at Danville in 1829, and was succeeded by Father Clancy. On February 1, 1836, Henry Fitzsimmons was sent to take charge of this territory and took up his residence in Carbondale, where a church had been built in 1832. In 1838 John Vincent O'Reilly was sent by Kenrick to assist in administering to the Catholics of this extensive territory. He took up his residence at Silver Lake and his charge comprised Susquehanna, Bradford, Tioga, Potter and Sullivan counties in Pennsylvania and the five adjoining counties in New York. The early history of the diocese is intimately bound to the labors of Father O'Reilly and the foundations of many present parishes were the results of his missionary zeal.

Bishops

Current Bishop
On February 23, 2010, Pope Benedict XVI appointed Monsignor Joseph C. Bambera the tenth Bishop of Scranton. Bambera was ordained and installed as bishop on April 26, 2010, at St. Peter's Cathedral. Cardinal Justin Rigali, Archbishop of Philadelphia, served as principal consecrator and James Timlin, Bishop Emeritus of Scranton, and John Dougherty, former Auxiliary Bishop of Scranton, served as co-consecrators. Pietro Sambi, the Apostolic Nuncio (papal ambassador) to the United States, read the papal appointment letter.

Bishops of Scranton
The following bishops have served as the diocesan bishop of the Diocese of Scranton.

 William O'Hara (1868–1899)
 Michael Hoban (1899–1927; coadjutor bishop 1896–1899)
 Thomas C. O'Reilly (1927–1938)
 William Hafey (1938–1954; coadjutor bishop 1937–1938)
 Jerome Hannan (1954–1965)
 J. Carroll McCormick (1966–1983)
 John O'Connor (1983–1984), appointed Archbishop of New York (Cardinal in 1985)
 James Timlin (1984–2003)
 Joseph Martino (2003–2009)
 Joseph Bambera (2010–present)

Former auxiliary bishops
 Andrew Brennan (1923–1926), appointed Bishop of Richmond
 Martin O'Connor (1942–1946), appointed Rector of the Pontifical North American College and later President of the Pontifical Council for Social Communications and Apostolic Nuncio and Titular Archbishop
 Henry Klonowski (1947–1973)
 James Timlin (1976–1984), appointed Bishop of Scranton
 Francis X. DiLorenzo (1988–1994), appointed Bishop of Honolulu and later Bishop of Richmond
 John Dougherty (1995–2009)

Other priests in the diocese who became bishops
 Eugene Augustine Garvey, appointed Bishop of Altoona in 1901
 Joseph Kopacz, appointed Bishop of Jackson in 2013
 Jeffrey Walsh, appointed Bishop of Gaylord in 2021

Education
Catholic education in the diocese began with the pioneer Father O'Reilly. In the autumn of 1842, he opened a college at St. Joseph's, Susquehanna County. Under his supervision, it grew and flourished and, in the 22 years of its existence, the college educated two bishops and over 20 priests. It was destroyed by fire on January 1, 1864, and was never rebuilt. St. Thomas College was established in 1888 and came under the direction of the Christian Brothers. In 1938, it was elevated to become the University of Scranton. The Society of Jesus took charge of its governance in 1942. Marywood University, also in Scranton, was founded and is operated by the Sisters of the Immaculate Heart of Mary. King's College in Wilkes-Barre is operated by the Congregation of the Holy Cross. And, in Dallas, Misericordia University was founded by the Religious Sisters of Mercy in 1924.

In the 1940s, it opened the South Scranton Catholic High School, later Bishop Klonowski High School. The school closed in 1982.

Due to rapidly declining enrollment and mounting financial obligations, Joseph Martino employed the Meitler Consultants to assess the Catholic schools and provide recommendations to restructure the education system. The final decisions, made in January 2007, resulted in the consolidation of all schools as under direct diocesan control. It created four regional systems (as shown below), and closed many individual schools. All of the secondary education centers in Lackawanna and Luzerne Counties were closed and replaced by two regional schools: Holy Cross High School to serve Lackawanna County and Holy Redeemer High School to serve Luzerne County. The curriculum of the diocese was standardized to promote continuity and uniformity in the education of the students, and improvements have been visible in the results of college attendance and standardized test results, which consistently rank well above the area's public schools. In April 2010, Bishop Joseph Bambera announced an adjustment of the diocesan school system, which dealt with financial contributions, marketing, and promotion of the schools, and the closure of four elementary school sites.

As of the 2011-2012 school year, the Diocese of Scranton operates six early childhood centers, sixteen elementary schools and four high schools, as shown below (in alphabetical order of the municipality in which they occur). Regional Systems are delineated and high school centers are in boldface.

Early childhood centers
Saint Gregory Early Childhood Center, Clarks Green
Saint Vincent DePaul Pre-School, Milford
Saint Catherine Pre-School, Moscow
Saint John Neumann Early Childhood Center, Muncy
Domiano Early Childhood Center, Scranton
Immaculate Care Pre-School, Scranton

Holy Cross School System
 Holy Cross High School, Dunmore
Our Lady of Peace Elementary, Clarks Summit
Saint Mary of Mount Carmel Elementary, Dunmore
LaSalle Academy, Dickson City & Jessup
Epiphany Elementary, Sayre
All Saints Academy, Scranton
Saint Clare/Saint Paul Elementary, Scranton
Saint Agnes Elementary, Towanda

Holy Redeemer School System
 Holy Redeemer High School, Wilkes-Barre
Holy Rosary Elementary School, Duryea
Wyoming Area Catholic Elementary School, Exeter
Holy Family Academy, Hazleton
Good Shepherd Academy, Kingston
Saint Nicholas/Saint Mary Elementary School, Wilkes Barre
Saint Jude Elementary School, Mountain Top

Notre Dame School System
 Notre Dame High School, East Stroudsburg
Monsignor McHugh Elementary, Cresco
Notre Dame (Elementary and Middle), East Stroudsburg

Saint John Neumann School System
 St. John Neumann Regional Academy High School, Williamsport
Saint John Neumann Regional Academy Elementary, Williamsport

Non-diocesan
 Scranton Preparatory School, Scranton (Society of Jesus)

Religious institutes
Religious Sisters of Mercy of the Americas (RSM)
Congregation of Sisters, Servants of the Immaculate Heart of Mary (IHM), Marywood University
Sisters of Christian Charity (SCC)
Sisters of Sts. Cyril and Methodius (ScCM)
Congregation of Notre Dame (CND)
Bernardine Sisters of St. Francis (OSF)
Little Sisters of the Poor
Society of Jesus (SJ, Jesuits), University of Scranton and Scranton Preparatory School
Congregation of Holy Cross (CSC), King's College
Congregation of the Passion (CP-Passionists), St. Ann's Basilica and Monastery
Sisters of Mercy, Misericordia University
Oblates of St. Joseph (OSJ-Italian)
Priestly Fraternity of St. Peter (FSSP-North American District Headquarters)
Religious Teachers Filippini (MPF), SS. Anthony and Rocco Convent, Dunmore
Sovereign Military Order of Malta (SMOM)

Sex abuse investigation 

In early 2016, a grand jury investigation, led by Pennsylvania Attorney General Josh Shapiro, began an inquiry into sexual abuse by Catholic clergy in six Pennsylvania dioceses: Scranton, Allentown, Harrisburg, Pittsburgh, Greensburg, and Erie.  The Diocese of Altoona-Johnstown and the Archdiocese of Philadelphia were not included, as they had been the subjects of earlier investigations.

On July 27, 2018, the Pennsylvania Supreme Court ordered that a redacted copy of the grand jury report be released to the public. On August 6, 2018, the Diocese released a statement stating that Bishop Bambera would cooperate with the investigation and publish the list of "credibly accused clergy" when the grand jury report is published.  The grand jury report was published on August 14, 2018 and showed that 301 clergy were accused of sexually abusing of children, with 59 coming from the Diocese of Scranton.

On August 31, 2018, Bishop Bambera forbade former bishop James Timlin from representing the diocese in public, given Timlin's failure to protect children from abusers.  Bambera himself had served as the Vicar for Priests for the Diocese of Scranton from 1995 to 1998, and he admitted that during that time he had helped then-Bishop Timlin reassign a priest who had abused a minor, although the decision was made by Timlin.  Bambera emphasized that since becoming bishop in 2010, he has pursued a zero-tolerance policy toward clerical abuse.

On August 14, 2020, it was revealed that the Diocese of Scranton, along with the Archdiocese of Philadelphia and fellow suffragan Dioceses in Pittsburgh and Allentown, was enduring the bulk of 150 new lawsuits filed against all eight Pennsylvania Catholic dioceses. Of these new lawsuits, 30 were filed against the Diocese of Scranton.

See also

 Catholic Church by country
 Catholic Church in the United States
 Ecclesiastical Province of Philadelphia
 Global organisation of the Catholic Church
 List of Roman Catholic archdioceses (by country and continent)
 List of Roman Catholic dioceses (alphabetical) (including archdioceses)
 List of Roman Catholic dioceses (structured view) (including archdioceses)
 List of the Catholic dioceses of the United States

References

Books

External links
 Roman Catholic Diocese of Scranton Official Site

 
Scranton, Pennsylvania
Religious organizations established in 1868
Scranton
Scranton
1868 establishments in Pennsylvania